Hvozdná is a municipality and village in Zlín District in the Zlín Region of the Czech Republic. It has about 1,300 inhabitants.

History
The first written mention of Hvozdná is from 1446. Some data indicate the existence of the settlement as early as 1425.

Twin towns – sister cities

Hvozdná is twinned with:
 East Bernard, United States

References

Villages in Zlín District